The Olympic marmot (Marmota olympus) is a rodent in the squirrel family, Sciuridae; it occurs only in the U.S. state of Washington, on the middle elevations of the Olympic Peninsula. The closest relatives of this species are the hoary marmot and the Vancouver Island marmot. In 2009, it was declared the official endemic mammal of Washington.

The species shows the greatest sexual dimorphism found in marmots, with adult males weighing on average 23% more than females. It can be identified by a wide head, small eyes and ears, stubby legs, and a long, bushy tail. Its sharp, rounded claws aid in digging burrows. The coat color changes with the season and with age, but an adult marmot's coat is brown all over with small whiter areas for most of the year.

The species has a diet consisting mainly of a variety of meadow flora, including dry grasses, which it also uses as bedding in burrows. It is preyed on by various terrestrial mammals and avian raptors, but its main predator today is the coyote, however the complex system of communication through whistling means most marmots remain safe for their entire life. The Olympic marmot is rated a species of the least concern on the IUCN Red List. It is protected by law in the Olympic National Park, which contains most of its habitat.

The burrows of this marmot are made in colonies, which are found in various mountain locations and differ in size. A colony may contain as few as one marmot family or multiple families with up to 40 marmots. Olympic marmots are very sociable animals which often engage in play fighting and vocalize four different whistles to communicate. During hibernation beginning in September, they are in a deep sleep and do not eat, causing them to lose half their body mass. Adults emerge in May and their young in June. Female marmots reach sexual maturity at three years of age, and produce litters of 1–6 every other mating season.

Taxonomy

American zoologist and ethnographer Clinton Hart Merriam first formally described the Olympic marmot in 1898, as Arctomys olympus, from a specimen he and Vernon Orlando Bailey collected on the Sol Duc River. The genus, Arctomys, is from the Greek for "bear-mouse". The species name, olympus (Olympic in Greek), was given because this species is native to the Olympic Peninsula. The species now is classified with all other marmots in the genus Marmota. Zoologist R. L. Rausch classified the Olympic marmot as the subspecies olympus of Marmota marmota (he included all North American marmots in this species, which now only includes the Eurasian Alpine marmot) in 1953, but it has usually been treated as a distinct species, a classification supported by taxonomic reviews starting with that of zoologist Robert S. Hoffmann and colleagues in 1979.

Within Marmota, the Olympic marmot is grouped with species such as the hoary marmot (M. caligata) in the subgenus Petromarmota. Among this grouping, mitochondrial DNA analyses suggest that the Olympic marmot could be the most basal species. The Olympic marmot is thought to have originated during the last glacial period as an isolated relict population of the hoary marmot in the Pleistocene ice-free refugia. As of October 2011, molecular data based upon the taxonomy of the Olympic Marmot was able to approximate the initial immigration of the species from Russia to their current location of the state of Washington, also known as the trans-Beringian exchange. Contrary to initial thought, this species of Marmot is thought to have crossed the Bering Strait 4.6 million years ago.

The Olympic marmot deviates from the typical Petromarmota marmots in the shape and large size of its mandible (jawbone), in differences of the dorsal (back) region, and having 40 chromosomes instead of 42, all of which are characteristics that resemble the subgenus Marmota. Some of the differences of the Olympic marmot's jawbone from the typical Petramarmota are also evident in the Vancouver Island marmot (M. vancouverensis), which evolved separately, but also occurs in a restricted range with a small population.

Description

This species may have the most pronounced sexual dimorphism found in marmots, with adult males weighing on average , post emergence in spring and at peak weights in autumn, respectively, and adult females weighing  at the same times. Going on published weights, the Olympic marmot is the largest of the six marmot species found in North America, averaging slight heavier in mean body mass than hoary marmot and Vancouver marmot. Mean linear dimensions suggest the Olympic species is about 7% larger on average than these other two large North America species. The species rivals some lesser-studied Asian species as the largest marmots and largest members of the squirrel family, with similar body masses attainable by some species such as the Tarbagan marmot and the Himalayan marmot.

The coat is double-layered, consisting of soft thick underfur, for warmth, and coarser outer hairs. Infant marmots' fur is dark gray in color; this changes in the yearling period to grayish brown with lighter patches. The adult coat is brown on the body with some smaller white or pale brown patches for most of the year, becoming darker overall as the year progresses. The first molt of the year occurs in June, commencing with two black patches of fur forming on the back of the shoulders. This black coloration then spreads to the rest of the body, and by the fall the coat is almost black. A second molt is thought to occur during hibernation, and upon emergence from hibernation in the spring Olympic marmots may be tan or yellowish. The Olympic marmot's muzzle is almost always white, with a white band in front of the eyes.

This species can be readily distinguished from the hoary marmot, with which it shares almost every other physical trait, by the lack of contrasting black feet and a black spot on the head. The Vancouver Island marmot has a similar coat color—chocolate brown with white patches.

Distribution and habitat 

Olympic marmots are native to the Olympic Mountains in the Olympic Peninsula of Washington state. About 90% of Olympic marmots' total habitat is located in Olympic National Park, where they are often sighted, especially on Hurricane Hill. Marmots are in decline in some areas of the park due to the encroachment of trees into meadows as well as predation by coyotes, and they are seldom seen in the wetter southwestern part.

Within the park, Olympic marmots inhabit lush sub-alpine and alpine meadows, fields, and montane scree slopes. They live in colonies spread out in various locations in the mountains and containing the burrows of differing numbers of marmot families. Some meadows can contain as few as one marmot family, and some can have multiple families adding up to 40 marmots. There is a higher risk of inbreeding and death from random events in meadows with fewer marmots, making migration essential to the survival of the species. The home range of a family of marmots usually covers from half an acre to five acres (0.2–2 hectares). The Olympic marmot is well-adapted to its generally cold natural habitat, where there is snowfall almost every month of the year on the mountain slopes and barren grasslands.

Ecology

Feeding

Olympic marmots eat meadow flora such as avalanche and glacier lilies, heather blossoms, subalpine lupine, mountain buckwheat, harebells, sedges, and mosses. They prefer green, tender, flowering plants over other sources of food, but roots are a large part of their diets in the early spring when other plants have not yet appeared. During May and June, they may resort to gnawing on trees for food. They also occasionally eat fruits and insects. Their water requirements are met from the juice in the vegetation they eat and dew on the plants' surfaces.

When snowfall covers vegetation, marmots have a more carnivorous diet, consuming carrion encountered while digging for roots and possibly killing late hibernating chipmunks. At this time, they also obtain water from melted snow. Hibernating Olympic marmots do not keep food in their burrows; instead, they gain fat before hibernating and can double their body weight to survive eight months without eating.

Predation

The Olympic marmot's predators are mostly terrestrial mammals such as coyotes, cougars, and bobcats; however, it is also preyed on by avian raptors such as golden eagles. Black bears probably rarely prey on marmots, as evidenced by the fact that their presence close to colonies generally does not generate alarm calls unless the bear advances to within  of the colony. The coyote is the primary predator and studies have shown that marmots make up approximately 20% of coyotes' diet during the summer months. During a study in the Olympic Mountains, 36 coyote droppings were collected and two of them contained marmot hairs.

In common with all other marmots, Olympic marmots use the trill as an alarm call to alert other marmots to predators. Continuing alarm calls indicate that a predator is close, and thus increase vigilance in the marmots; a single alarm call results in the marmots curiously looking around for the predator. Sightings of land predators, coyotes in particular, receive more alarm calls than aerial predators. Fishers are viewed as predators by Olympic marmots, eliciting alarm calls when just passing by a colony. It has also been observed that these trills can be used as a mechanism to trick and frustrate predators. An additional behavior that takes place when a marmot becomes nervous or bothered by a predator is that it retracts its top lip to show its upper incisors. It is almost like a greeting for predators.

If the marmot is able to flee into a burrow and sound an alarm call, other marmots will scurry to their burrows for safety. But the predator does not stop here; it is usually persistent and will scratch outside the entrance to try to dig out its prey. Minutes later, when a marmot from a nearby burrow peers out to see if the predator has gone, it will sometimes sound another alarm call, which summons the predator to its burrow. It dives back underground and the predator usually remains frustrated as these alarm calls continue and force it to run around from burrow to burrow, getting tired and aggravated, and finally giving up.

As humans in the Olympic National Park do not hunt the marmot, but simply observe them, they do not pose a threat. When researchers intrude on colonies to observe behavior, the families living in burrows there initially vocalize ascending calls, showing surprise, but later adjust to the presence of humans, allowing studies to proceed.

The parasites of the Olympic marmot include the cestode Diandrya composita, and fleas of the genus Oropsylla.

Behavior

Colonies

Olympic marmots are gregarious burrowing animals, living in colonies typically containing multiple burrows. Activity varies with the weather, time of day, and time of year; owing to rainfall and fog cover during June, July, and August, the marmots spend most of the day inside their burrows, and forage for food mostly in the morning and evening. In between these times, Olympic marmots can sometimes be found lying on rocks where they sun themselves for warmth, grooming each other, playing, chirping, and feeding together. Burrows are multi-purpose structures, used for hibernation, protection from bad weather and predators, and to raise newborn pups.

A typical colony of marmots consists of a male, two to three females, and their young, sometimes living in groups of more than a dozen animals; young marmots stay with their family for at least two years, so a burrow is often home to a newly born litter and a litter of two-year-olds. Marmots seldom move to other colonies with the exception of sub-adults of two to three years old, which may leave the home colony to start a new family elsewhere; females move only a few hundred meters, though males often move several kilometers away from their birth burrow.

A colony may have a subordinate or "satellite" male, smaller and younger than the colony male, who may take over as the dominant male if the incumbent dies. After emergence from hibernation, if the satellite male and the colony male are both still living in the same colony, the dominant colony male may chase the satellite around multiple times per day. The satellite male's feeding area is limited to areas far from the rest of the marmots in the colony, and he must stay away from the other marmots' burrows as long as the colony male is near. While the satellite male does not approach the other marmots in the colony, they sometimes make trips over to the satellite male's burrow, often about two times an hour. After more time has passed since hibernation, males will become less hostile towards each other, and less avoidance and chasing will occur. Male-male competition ends around the same time that the reproductive season does. The diminution of hostile behavior is only temporary, as the satellite male becomes assigned to its subordinate status again the following spring after emergence from hibernation and the ritual begins again.

Communication
When greeting each other, these very sociable animals will usually touch noses or nose to cheek; in courtship rituals they may inter-lock teeth and nibble each other's ears and necks. They may also engage in play fighting, in which two marmots on their hind legs push each other with their paws; this play fighting is more aggressive between older marmots. In fights that have been observed during a study, only about 10% of fights had distinct outcomes.

When communicating vocally, they have four different types of whistles, differing in this from their close relatives, the hoary marmot and the Vancouver Island marmot. The Olympic marmot's whistles include flat calls, ascending calls, descending calls, and trills; all of these are in a small frequency range of about 2,700 Hz. Flat, ascending, and descending calls are most often voiced singly. The ascending call has a duration of about half a second, starting with a "yell" on one note and ending with a "chip" on a higher note; it is often used as a distress or warning call for unfamiliar smells and noises. These same "yips" are heard when Olympic marmots are play fighting, along with low growls and chattering of teeth. The descending call ends on a lower note than the one on which it started. The trill, which sounds like multiple ascending calls put together as one longer sound, consists of multiple ranging notes and is voiced as an alarm call to communicate to other marmots in the area that danger may be approaching and they should return to their burrows. Females with young have the responsibility to watch out for their young and other relatives near the burrow, and therefore voice the trill more often than other Olympic marmots. If marmots are not accustomed to human contact in a certain area, they may also sound a trill when seeing a person, in order to alert other marmots. At places like Hurricane Ridge, where seeing humans is a frequent occurrence, most marmots will not acknowledge human presence at all.

They also communicate through the sense of smell. A gland located in their cheek exudes chemicals which they rub on scenting points, such as shrubs and rocks, which can be smelled by other marmots in the area.

Hibernation
Olympic marmots start to enter hibernation in early September. Before hibernating, the marmots bring dry grasses into the burrow for bedding or food. Sometimes in early September marmots will stay in their burrows for a few consecutive days, with only brief outings that allow for a little foraging. During this period, they do not play fight or socialize with other marmots; they limit themselves to peeking out and casually sitting outside their burrows. Nonparous females (those who have not given birth yet) and adult males become inactive first, because they do not need to store as much fat beforehand. The parous females, yearlings, and young of the year become inactive a few weeks later, because they have to gain more weight. The marmots of a colony hibernate in a single burrow space, which they keep closed with dirt. Adults emerge in May, and the young in June. Marmots do not eat during hibernation, so they have to store fat before becoming inactive.

These marmots are "deep hibernators"; they cannot easily be awoken. Their body temperature drops to below  and heart rate can slow to three beats per minute. Marmots warm their bodies about every ten days. Olympic marmots lose 50% of their body mass over the seven to eight months of winter hibernation. Hibernation is the most dangerous time for them as, in years of light snowfall, as many as 50% of the young born that year will die from the cold because of the lack of insulation that is provided by good snow cover. When they emerge in early May, thick snow cover is still present from the preceding winter, so they are not very active at this time. Sometimes they are so disoriented after awaking from hibernation that they have to relearn the colony's landmarks (which are now covered in snow, which obscures them even more); they wander around aimlessly until they find their burrows.

Life cycle
This species, along with the hoary marmot, has the lowest reproductive rate of any rodent. A female Olympic marmot has a litter of from one to six young (3.3 on average) in alternate years. In a given year, a third of females will have a litter. Half of the pups die before the following spring. Those pups that survive the following spring can live into their teens. Both males and females mature sexually at three years, but females generally do not reproduce until they are four and a half years old. The marmot comes out from hibernation at the beginning of May, and estrus (heat) occurs about two weeks later. After hibernation ends, both male and female Olympic marmots attempt to entice the opposite sex with courtship rituals. Females who have never produced a litter before tend to be more aggressive and will chase or instigate fights with males; females which have already produced young tend to greet the male with nasal to nasal or nasal to genital contact, with copulation following shortly afterwards. This approach is more successful than the aggressive manner of the non-parous female, with mating taking place within 11 to 20 days after hibernation. The relationship between a sexually mature male and female Olympic marmot is polygynous; males tend to breed with three or four females in each mating season.

Approximately four weeks after mating, the female gives birth to her young in a grass-lined burrow underground. Newborn pups cannot see, have no fur, and are pink in color. At first, the young exhibit no sexual dimorphism. It is about a month before the young Olympic marmots first leave the burrow; around the same time, they begin to be weaned. Even after they are allowed to emerge, the young initially stay within the immediate vicinity of the burrow, where they can be found chasing each other and wrestling playfully. Within a few weeks after first emerging from the burrow, the young are fully weaned and can feed themselves. Olympic marmots are not completely independent from their mothers until they reach two years of age. Breeding-age female marmots are extremely important to marmot populations. If a female of breeding age dies it can take years to replace her; marmots are usually limited to six pups in a litter, the maturation period is long, and many marmots die before reaching maturity.

Interaction with humans

The Olympic marmot is the second-rarest North American marmot, behind the critically endangered Vancouver Island marmot. Marmots were first sighted in the Olympic Peninsula in the 1880s. In the 1960s, David P. Barash conducted a three-year study of Olympic marmots after which he reported that there was an abundance of marmots in the mountains. In 1989, the total Olympic marmot population was calculated to be only about 2,000, but this low number was due to poor data collection. Other than this population census, little further research was done on the Olympic marmot until the late 1990s, when concerns arose about population status.

Rangers and frequent visitors to the Olympic National Park had noticed that some populations of Olympic marmots had disappeared from their usual habitats. In response to this, the University of Michigan began a population study in 2002, in which the marmot population continued to decline by about 10% a year until 2006. Predation by coyotes that had not been present in the area before the 20th century was found to be the main cause of death of females, inhibiting population re-growth. By 2006, numbers had dropped to 1,000 individuals; this figure increased to around 4,000 from 2007 to 2010, when colonies stabilized and survival rates rose. In 2010, volunteers started to collect and store data about marmot populations in the park through a monitoring program. The Olympic marmot has been considered a species of least concern on the IUCN Red List since first being included in 1996. Its range is small, but 90% of its total habitat is protected due to being in Olympic National Park. The park, which holds multiple other endemic species, has been designated a UNESCO Biosphere Reserve and a World Heritage Site. State law declares that the Olympic marmot is a protected wildlife species and cannot be hunted.

The species is susceptible to climate change because of their sensitivity to changed habitats. When meadows in Olympic National Park dried out, marmots there died or moved. In the long term, meadows may be superseded by forests. Climate change will alter the timing, composition, and quality of the marmots' food. Olympic marmots can become more vulnerable to predators when daytime temperatures rise too high for foraging, causing them to forage in the cooler evenings when predators are more difficult to notice. In warm winters, there is heavier predation by coyotes. Marmots become more accessible to coyotes as lower banks of snow allow coyotes to move up higher on mountains where marmots dwell, into areas which they could not usually reach during an average cold winter. Climate change could also have positive effects; a warmer climate would result in a longer growing season in which marmots could mature more quickly and thus breed more often.

In 2009, this marmot was designated a state symbol of Washington: the official "endemic mammal." Governor Chris Gregoire's signing of Senate Bill 5071 was the result of a two-year effort by the fourth and fifth graders of Wedgwood Elementary School in Seattle. The students researched the marmot's habits, and answered legislators' questions to overcome initial bipartisan opposition to another state symbol.

References

Works cited

External links
 

Marmots
Mammals of the United States
Endemic fauna of Washington (state)
Mammals described in 1898
Taxa named by Clinton Hart Merriam